Fascista is a genus of moths in the family Gelechiidae.

Species
 Fascista bimaculella (Chambers, 1872)
 Fascista cercerisella (Chambers, 1872)
 Fascista quinella (Zeller, 1873)

References

Gelechiini